The 1977 Arizona State Sun Devils football team represented Arizona State University during the 1977 NCAA Division I football season. This was Arizona State's final season as a member of the Western Athletic Conference (WAC).

Schedule

Personnel

References

Arizona State
Arizona State Sun Devils football seasons
Western Athletic Conference football champion seasons
Arizona State Sun Devils football